Manduca brasiliensis is a moth of the  family Sphingidae.

Distribution 

It is found in Brazil, Argentina and Paraguay.

Description 

It is similar to Manduca scutata. The primary differences are as follows: it is smaller; the sides of the thorax and upper portion of the head and front wing are more greyish; there are smaller black spots on the underbelly; the black discal patches on the upper portion of the front wing are shorter; there is a broader black median band on the upper portion of the hind wing; and the black lines on the lower side of the hind wing are more prominent.

References

Manduca
Moths described in 1911
Sphingidae of South America
Moths of South America
Taxa named by Karl Jordan